Hoopla Software, Inc. is a privately held SaaS company founded in 2010, headquartered in Silicon Valley, San Jose, California. The company is backed by Trinity Ventures, Safeguard Scientifics, Illuminate Ventures and Salesforce. The company currently has over 500 customers and between 11-50 employees. The Hoopla software uses gamification technology to help motivate sales teams.

History
The company was founded in Philadelphia in 2010. Michael Smalls, the founder and CEO of the SaaS company moved headquarters to San Jose in 2012.  The company received $2.8M of funding in the Series A round and in February 2014, Hoopla has raised a $8M Series B round funding. The total funding of $10.8 was received from Safeguard Scientifics, Salesforce Ventures, Illuminates Ventures and Trinity Ventures.

Product
The initial product launch included a cloud-based application which integrates the Salesforce CRM which was available on Hoopla TV. With the 2014 release Hoopla launched a mobile version.

Modern game mechanics (gamification) and motivation psychology are used to build this platform. A team can create customizable leaderboards and challenges.

References

External links
Official website

Software companies based in the San Francisco Bay Area
Companies based in San Jose, California
Software companies established in 2010
2010 establishments in California
Lists of software
Web applications
Defunct software companies of the United States